James Dudley Dewell (September 3, 1837 – April 19, 1906) was an American politician who was the 67th Lieutenant Governor of Connecticut from 1897 to 1899.

James Dewell was born in Norfolk in Connecticut. He was the third of four children of John and Mary Dewell. His father was born in 1797 and worked as a Scythe Maker. His mother was born in 1804. Later he worked as a Wholesale Grocery Dealer. Since 1860 he was married to Mary E. Keys (1840-1913). The couple had five children. He also owned a schooner named Derwell. He joined the Republican Party and in 1896 he was elected to the office of the lieutenant Governor of Connecticut. In this function he was the deputy of Governor Lorrin A. Cooke and he presided over the Connecticut Senate. His two-year term ended in 1899. James Dewell died in 1906 in New Haven where he had spent the most time of his life.

External links
 

1837 births
1906 deaths
People from Norfolk, Connecticut
Connecticut Republicans
Lieutenant Governors of Connecticut
Politicians from New Haven, Connecticut
19th-century American politicians